Post-YBAs refers to British artists emerging in the 2000s after the Young British Artists.

Post-YBA artists include Tim Noble and Sue Webster, Carey Young, Oliver Payne and Nick Relph, David Thorpe, Eva Rothschild, Mike Nelson, Darren Almond, and Jeremy Deller.

According to Matthew Higgs, Simon Starling's winning of the Turner Prize in 2005 reflected a post-YBA sensibility which is more modestly material and formal than spectacle-driven. Enrico David tapped into a post-YBA vogue for craft. The post-YBA generation has also been associated with neo-conceptual art with a political edge.

Artists associated with the post-YBAs include Martin Maloney.

References

British art
Contemporary art